Influx may refer to:

 Flux (biology) of ions, molecules or other substances from the extracellular space to the intracellular space
 Influx, a 2014 science-fiction novel by Daniel Suarez
 Influx (album), an album by Janus
 "Influx", a song by Higher Intelligence Agency from their Colourform album
 InfluxDB, an open-source time series database

See also
 Efflux (disambiguation)
 Inflow (disambiguation)